Tyrod Diallo Taylor (born August 3, 1989) is an American football quarterback for the New York Giants of the National Football League (NFL). He played college football for Virginia Tech, leading the Hokies to the 2009 Orange Bowl as a Sophomore and 2011 Orange Bowl during his senior year. He was drafted by the Baltimore Ravens in the sixth round of the 2011 NFL Draft and served as the backup to starting quarterback Joe Flacco, including during the Ravens' Super Bowl XLVII victory over the San Francisco 49ers.

Taylor was signed by the Buffalo Bills as a free agent in 2015, taking over the starting quarterback duties that season and earning a Pro Bowl appearance. In 2017, he helped the Bills make their first playoff berth in 17 years. He was traded to the Cleveland Browns in March 2018, with the Bills drafting Josh Allen to replace him. Taylor subsequently earned the starting position for the Browns, Los Angeles Chargers, and later the Houston Texans, but was sidelined due to injuries all three times and replaced by rookies Baker Mayfield, Justin Herbert, and Davis Mills respectively.

High school career
At Hampton High School, in Hampton, Virginia, Taylor was a three-sport athlete in football, basketball, and track. In football, he helped lead the team as a quarterback, while also becoming the team's kick returner and safety.  During his four years as starter, he led the team to a 34–4 record. He accumulated 7,690 yards of offense and scored 100 total touchdowns. He passed for 5,144 yards and 44 touchdowns, while rushing for 2,546 yards and 56 touchdowns.

When Taylor graduated from Hampton in 2007, he was rated as the No. 1 dual-threat quarterback at Rivals.com. ESPN.com rated him the No. 3 overall quarterback, while Scout.com said he's the nation's seventh-best passer. Taylor, who is 6'1" and 200 pounds, ran a 4.55-second 40-yard dash.

Taylor narrowed his final two choices down to Virginia Tech and the University of Florida, and chose to attend Virginia Tech.

College career

Freshman year

During Taylor's freshman year, Taylor shared time for most of the season with the junior quarterback Sean Glennon.

Taylor's first action of college football came in the game against the LSU Tigers on September 8, 2007.  In that game, Taylor completed 7-of-18 passes for 62 yards, rushed for 44 yards on nine attempts including his first collegiate touchdown.  After that game, Tyrod was named the starter by head coach Frank Beamer. In his first collegiate start against Ohio, Tyrod threw for 287 yards, adding a rushing touchdown.

One of Taylor's early accolades was rushing for 92 yards and a touchdown as well as passing for 204 yards and two touchdowns in leading Virginia Tech to its first victory against Florida State in two decades. The win was the first ever for Frank Beamer against Florida State head coach Bobby Bowden.

On October 13, in the second quarter of a game against Duke, Taylor suffered a high ankle sprain which forced him to miss two games. Taylor returned in a game at Georgia Tech, but did not start for the rest of the season and rotated time with starter Sean Glennon.

Throughout the season, Taylor accumulated 1,356 total yards, including 927 passing and 429 rushing.  He completed 72-of-134 passing attempts, for a completion percentage of 53.7.  He scored 11 touchdowns during the year, five passing and six rushing.

Sophomore year

Coming into the 2008 season, Taylor was intended to be redshirted. After Virginia Tech's loss to East Carolina University though, his redshirt was taken off due to Tech's need for more offense. Taylor's first appearance of the season came in the second game of the season against Furman, where he rushed for 112 yards and a touchdown.  His first sophomore start came in the following week against Georgia Tech.

After starting every game of the 2008 season leading up to the Florida State game on October 25, Taylor suffered a high ankle sprain on the first play of the Florida State game.  Sean Glennon relieved Taylor at the quarterback position after this setback.  While Glennon got the start versus Miami, Taylor split time with Glennon and led a crucial fourth quarter to make it a two-point game 16–14.  However, he was sacked in a crucial 4th and 3 with less than two minutes to go. After the loss, Taylor started against Duke. After committing five turnovers in the first half, he was pulled from the game and replaced by Sean Glennon. Taylor then started next week at Virginia. He performed well including a 73-yard run. He was 12-for-18 for 137 yards and one touchdown while rushing 16 times for 137 yards.  He then started in the ACC Championship Game win over Boston College and was named the ACC Championship Game MVP. On January 1, 2009, he led the Hokies to a 20–7 victory over the Cincinnati Bearcats in the 2009 Orange Bowl. Overall, he finished his sophomore season with 1,036 passing yards with two touchdowns and seven interceptions.

Junior year

During his junior season, Taylor led the Hokies to a 9–3 regular season record and a 2nd-place finish in the Coastal Division of the ACC. The Hokies played the Tennessee Volunteers in the 2009 Chick-fil-A Bowl and won 37–14, finishing with a final record of 10–3. After climbing as high as #4 in the rankings, Tech lost back to back games against Georgia Tech and North Carolina, but finished the season ranked 10th in both the AP and USA Today Top 25 polls. In the 2009 season, he finished with 2,311 passing yards, 13 touchdowns, and five interceptions. After his junior season, he had a 23–5 career record at Virginia Tech, which was the second most wins of all time for a starting quarterback at Virginia Tech.

Senior year

Taylor's senior season began with two heartbreaking losses to Boise State at FedExField and at home to Division I-FCS James Madison. Taylor was 15-of-22 for 186 yards and two touchdowns, along with 73 yards on the ground, against Boise State, but was unable to respond following a Broncos score with 1:03 remaining. However, Taylor ultimately led the Hokies to a remarkable turnaround season, winning 11 consecutive games after the 0–2 start. The 2010 Hokies became the first ACC team to finish with an undefeated 8–0 record in ACC play in 10 years. They became ACC Champions for the fourth time in seven seasons with a 44–33 win over Florida State in the 2010 ACC Championship Game in Charlotte. Overall, in his final collegiate season, he had 2,743 passing yards, 24 touchdowns, and five interceptions. Taylor finished the regular season as ACC Player of the Year and ACC Championship Game Most Valuable Player.

Taylor participated in the 2011 East-West Shrine Game. He completed four of his five passes for 59 yards.

College statistics

Professional career

Taylor was drafted in the sixth round with the 180th overall pick by the Baltimore Ravens in the 2011 NFL Draft. He was the 11th quarterback to be selected that year. The Ravens previously acquired the pick from the St. Louis Rams in a trade that sent Mark Clayton to St. Louis. The Ravens played him at quarterback in spite of the fact many of the other 31 teams believed he would better be suited at wide receiver instead.

Baltimore Ravens

2011 season 
In his first pre-season start against the Atlanta Falcons, Taylor left with a shoulder injury. Early tests revealed no separation and his injury was characterized as a contusion.

Taylor played in his first regular season game on December 4, 2011, in a victory over the Cleveland Browns. He rushed for a two-yard gain. He appeared on December 18 and threw his first-ever regular season pass, an 18-yard completion to Anquan Boldin for the final play of the game. He also lined up as a wide receiver for one play against the Indianapolis Colts.

2012 season 
On December 30, 2012,  Flacco was rested for most of the Week 17 game against the Cincinnati Bengals, offering Taylor significant playing time. Taylor scored his first career touchdown on a one-yard bootleg in the fourth quarter. However, Taylor also threw a crucial interception to defensive end Carlos Dunlap, which Dunlap returned for a touchdown. The Ravens lost the game against the Bengals by a score of 23–17. Taylor, as a backup, went on to earn a championship ring when the Ravens eventually won Super Bowl XLVII over the San Francisco 49ers.

2013 season 
Taylor had a decent preseason in 2013 when he completed 21-of-36 passes for 263 yards and four touchdowns with two interceptions. He also showed his versatility as a runner using designed runs and scrambles while rushing for 66 yards on 15 carries. His strong preseason performance allowed him to keep his job as the Ravens backup quarterback for the third straight season.

Taylor did not see any action in the 2013 season until Week 10, in a win against the Cincinnati Bengals. He ran an end-around handoff from Flacco for a gain of 18 yards, which was the longest run by any Ravens player in that game. In Week 12 against the New York Jets, Taylor played 12 total snaps, five at quarterback. He gained seven yards on four carries though he did have a 17-yard first down run in the first quarter. His total yardage was brought down by two second half runs where he lost 13 yards. He also had one reception for six yards. On December 22, 2013, Taylor would enter the game for Flacco during a blowout loss to the New England Patriots. On his very first snap, Gino Gradkowski snapped it too far to the right, and was recovered by New England for a touchdown. He finished the 41–7 loss, completing 1-of-4 passes for two yards and an interception that the Patriots defense returned for a touchdown.

2014 season 

Taylor's only action in the 2014 season was during a Week 6 48–17 blowout victory over the Tampa Bay Buccaneers. Taylor came in during the fourth quarter to relieve Flacco.

Buffalo Bills

2015 season 

On March 12, 2015, Taylor signed a three-year, $3.35 million contract with the Buffalo Bills. On August 31, 2015, Taylor was named starting quarterback of the Bills for the 2015 season by head coach Rex Ryan, beating out former Bills first round pick EJ Manuel and veteran Matt Cassel after a preseason quarterback competition among the three candidates.

In Week 1, Taylor completed 14-of-19 passes for 195 yards and one touchdown while also rushing for 41 yards as the Bills beat the Indianapolis Colts by a score of 27–14. The next week against the New England Patriots Taylor threw 30 passes, completing 23 passes and throwing three touchdowns while throwing three interceptions in a 40–32 loss. Taylor also added 43 yards and a touchdown on the ground. Taylor had the best game of his career so far in a 41–14 win over the Miami Dolphins. He completed 21 of his 29 attempts with three touchdowns and no interceptions while adding 12 rushing yards.

During a Week 5 come-from-behind victory over the Tennessee Titans, Taylor became only the fifth quarterback in NFL history to throw for at least 100 yards, run for at least 70 yards and catch a pass in a single game. His jersey from the game was sent to the Pro Football Hall of Fame in Canton, Ohio.  The following week it was reported that Taylor had suffered an MCL injury during the game, with the expectation that he would miss the Bills' Week 6 match-up against the undefeated Cincinnati Bengals, and then be re-evaluated the next week.

Taylor returned to action Week 9 and led the Bills to a 33–17 victory over the Miami Dolphins. Taylor finished 11-for-12 with 181 passing yards and a passing touchdown to go along with a career-high 146.5 passer rating. In the win, Taylor also set the franchise record for completion percentage in a single game, completing 91.7% of his passes.

Taylor set the Bills' franchise record for consecutive passes without an interception in the third quarter of a Week 13 win against the Houston Texans. The previous record had been held by Drew Bledsoe since 2002. The streak ended on the last pass of the game in a Week 14 loss to the Philadelphia Eagles (222). The Bills were eliminated from playoff contention the very next week after a 35–25 loss to the Washington Redskins. In Week 16, Taylor set the Bills franchise record for most rushing yards in a season by a quarterback, and he became the first Bills quarterback with over 500 yards rushing in a season. The Bills finished 8–8 on the year, only the third time they finished .500 or above consecutive years since the late 1990s.

Taylor finished the 2015 season completing 63.7 percent of his passes, while throwing for over 3,000 yards, with 20 touchdowns to just six interceptions. He added 568 rushing yards on the ground.

On January 25, 2016, Taylor and teammate offensive lineman Eric Wood were selected to the Pro Bowl. They replaced Panthers quarterback Cam Newton and Panthers center Ryan Kalil, who were playing in Super Bowl 50. In the Pro Bowl, Taylor completed 8-of-14 passes for 120 yards and a touchdown, but he also threw three interceptions.

2016 season 

Taylor entered training camp as the starting quarterback for the Bills in the final year of his original Bills contract, as the third year of his deal was voided when he played more than 50% of the snaps in the 2015 season. On August 12, 2016, Taylor signed a six-year contract extension worth $92 million with the Bills. The contract contained an option after the first year, however. On Christmas Eve, against the Miami Dolphins, he passed for a career-high 329 yards and three touchdowns in the 34–31 overtime loss. Taylor completed 269-of-436 passes for 3,023 yards and 17 touchdowns with six interceptions in the 2016 season. In addition, he rushed for 580 yards and six touchdowns. He was made inactive for the final game of the season due to a clause in his contract that would make his 2017 salary guaranteed if he suffered a serious injury. At the time of the game, he already had a groin injury that could require surgery. On January 5, 2017, Taylor had surgery to repair a core muscle issue. Taylor was selected as a 2017 Pro Bowl alternate, but he declined the invitation due to injury.

2017 season
After the firing of Rex Ryan, it was widely speculated that the Bills would either trade Taylor or decline his option. Nonetheless, the Bills and Taylor agreed to restructure his contract, keeping Taylor signed with the team until the end of the 2018 season. Taylor sustained a concussion early in the third preseason game against the Baltimore Ravens, but was able to recover in time to start in the Week 1 game against the New York Jets.

During the Week 7 game against the Tampa Bay Buccaneers, Taylor helped lead the Bills to a fourth-quarter comeback, driving the offense 75 yards downfield for the game-tying touchdown with less than three minutes remaining. The Buccaneers fumbled on their next possession, setting up the Bills' game-winning field goal by Steven Hauschka. Taylor finished the game with 268 passing yards and a touchdown while also rushing for 53 yards. On November 2, he had a career-high 29 completions on 40 attempts for 285 yards and two passing touchdowns to go along with 35 rushing yards and a rushing touchdown in a 31–24 loss to the New York Jets.

On November 15, following a blowout loss to the New Orleans Saints in which Taylor only threw for 56 yards, the Bills announced that Taylor would be benched in favor of rookie Nathan Peterman. However, Peterman threw five interceptions during his first start against the Los Angeles Chargers and was replaced by Taylor at halftime. Taylor returned to the Bills' starting lineup in Week 12. During Week 13 against the New England Patriots, Taylor was limited to only 65 passing yards and was carted off the field after aggravating a knee injury initially suffered in the first quarter. He was relieved by Peterman for the remainder of the game as the Bills lost 23–3. Due to the knee injury, Taylor was inactive for Week 14, but returned as the starter in Week 15. The Bills finished the season with a 9–7 record, clinching their first playoff berth since 1999.

In the Wild Card Round against the Jacksonville Jaguars, Taylor had 134 passing yards and an interception before leaving the 10–3 loss with a concussion.

Cleveland Browns

On March 9, 2018, the Bills agreed to trade Taylor to the Cleveland Browns for a 2018 third-round draft pick. The deal became official five days later, on March 14, at the start of the NFL year.

Despite drafting quarterback Baker Mayfield first overall in the 2018 NFL Draft, the Browns committed to Taylor as their season starter. In his first start against the Pittsburgh Steelers, Taylor helped the Browns snap a 17-game losing streak dating back to 2016, but the game ended in a 21–21 tie. Taylor completed 15 of 40 pass attempts for 197 yards, a touchdown, and an interception while also rushing for 77 yards and a touchdown.

Taylor was injured in Week 3 against the New York Jets, which prompted Mayfield to take over at quarterback en route to the Browns finally winning their first game since 2016. Taylor appeared in only one other game in the 2018 season, completing an 11-yard pass against the Kansas City Chiefs in Week 9.

Los Angeles Chargers

2019 season
On March 13, 2019, Taylor signed a two-year, $11 million contract with the Los Angeles Chargers, reuniting with former offensive coordinator and one-time interim head coach Anthony Lynn. In Week 14, in the 45–10 victory over the Jacksonville Jaguars, Taylor came into the game in relief of Philip Rivers and threw a 14-yard touchdown pass to Virgil Green.

2020 season
Following a shortened training camp leading up to the 2020 season, and with Rivers having signed with the Indianapolis Colts in free agency, Lynn named Taylor the Chargers' starter going into the season over rookie first-round pick Justin Herbert.

Making his first start since Week 3 of the 2018 season, Taylor completed 16 of 30 passes for 208 yards as the Chargers defeated the Cincinnati Bengals 16–13 in Week 1. Taylor suffered a rib injury during pre-game warmups the following week before a matchup with the Kansas City Chiefs and was hospitalized, leaving Herbert to start at the last minute. Days later, it was revealed the Chargers' team doctor accidentally punctured Taylor's lung while administering a painkiller injection prior to the game. On October 8, Lynn announced that Herbert would be the starter for the remainder of the season.

Taylor saw brief action during a Week 9 game against the Las Vegas Raiders. Following a touchdown, Taylor came in on a two-point conversion attempt after Herbert was briefly sidelined after taking a hit. The two-point conversion attempt failed and Herbert returned the following series; the Chargers lost 31–26.

Houston Texans
On March 22, 2021, Taylor signed a one-year contract with the Houston Texans. He was reunited with Texans' new head coach David Culley, who previously coached Taylor as the quarterbacks coach with the Buffalo Bills in 2017. On September 6, 2021, head coach David Culley announced Taylor the Week 1 starting quarterback due to legal issues regarding starting quarterback Deshaun Watson. In his first start with the Texans, Taylor finished 21-of-33 for 291 yards and two touchdowns along with 41 rushing yards in a 37–21 upset victory over the Jacksonville Jaguars. In Week 2, against the Cleveland Browns, Taylor suffered a hamstring injury in the first half and was replaced by rookie quarterback Davis Mills for the rest of the game. He was placed on injured reserve on September 21. He was activated on November 6. During the team's Week 13 game against the Indianapolis Colts, Taylor was benched in the third quarter in favor of Mills; Taylor finished the game 5-of-13 for 45 yards with an interception. Houston would go on to lose the game 31–0, the team's second shutout loss of the season. On December 10, Culley announced Mills will be the starter for the rest of the season.

New York Giants
On March 17, 2022, Taylor signed a two-year contract worth $11 million with the New York Giants. Taylor made his regular season in the game debut at quarterback in the third quarter of the fourth game of the season, during which he was concussed and was subsequently put into NFL concussion protocol.  It was his fourth concussion in five years.  He had come into play in the second half to replace the Giants' starter Daniel Jones who had just sustained a sprained ankle.

NFL career statistics

Regular season

Postseason

Bills franchise records
Highest completion percentage in single game (91.7%)
Most consecutive pass attempts without an interception (222)
First quarterback to post back-to-back-to-back seasons with over 400 yards rushing (2015–17)
First quarterback to post back-to-back seasons with over 500 yards rushing (2015–16)

Former Bills records
Most rushing yards in a game by a quarterback (79)
Most rushing yards in a season by a quarterback (580) 
Most career rushing yards by a quarterback (1,575)
Highest career passer rating, 500 or more passes thrown (92.5)
Highest career completion percentage, 500 or more passes thrown (62.6)

Player profile
Despite a smaller-than-average frame for an NFL quarterback, Taylor has received praise for his work ethic, elusiveness in the pocket and as a runner, and athleticism. He is also noted for his low turnover rate (the second lowest among passers with at least 1,000 attempts as of 2019), though critics also point out his conservative playing style, often labeling him as a "game manager" in a similar mold as players such as Alex Smith.

Personal life
Taylor lists Steve Young, Warren Moon, Michael Vick, and Allen Iverson as his biggest athletic inspirations. He is a Christian, having been raised in the faith by his parents. In 2020, Taylor made a $25,000 contribution via his foundation to the Virginia Peninsula Foodbank during the COVID-19 pandemic.

Upon joining the Browns and being featured on Hard Knocks, a minor controversy on how to pronounce Taylor's first name emerged. While the vast majority of people, including TV analysts and Taylor's father and coaches, had been pronouncing it "TIE-rod" for years, Browns guard Joel Bitonio and fourth-string quarterback Brogan Roback were heard on the show pronouncing it "tuh-ROD", which was supported by Taylor's mother and the Browns' senior vice president of operations. When asked about it, Taylor quipped that while he had heard "TIE-rod" most of his life and went with it, his mother gave him the name "tuh-ROD", but that she "doesn't call [him] by [his] first name".

Notes

References

External links

New York Giants bio
Virginia Tech Hokies bio

1989 births
Living people
African-American players of American football
African-American Christians
American football quarterbacks
Baltimore Ravens players
Buffalo Bills players
Cleveland Browns players
Hampton High School (Virginia) alumni
Houston Texans players
Los Angeles Chargers players
Players of American football from Virginia
Sportspeople from Hampton, Virginia
Unconferenced Pro Bowl players
Virginia Tech Hokies football players
21st-century African-American sportspeople
20th-century African-American people
New York Giants players